Janelle Adams (born August 17, 1990) is an American professional basketball player. She currently plays for the Canberra Capitals in the WNBL.

College
Adams played college basketball at Cleveland State University in Cleveland, Ohio for the Vikings. During her time at Cleveland State, Adams was a strong combo guard and one of the teams premier defenders.

Cleveland State statistics

Source

Professional career

Australia
In 2012, Adams began her professional career in Queensland, Australia with the Toowoomba Mountaineers in the Queensland Basketball League. After three seasons with the Mountaineers, Adams travelled into the city, signing with the Brisbane Spartans and raising her level by playing in the South East Australian Basketball League. Adams was then signed by the Canberra Capitals to play in the Women's National Basketball League, Australia's premier women's league and the strongest league in the southern hemisphere. This is the highest level of basketball Adams has participated in. Here, she will play alongside the likes of Marianna Tolo and Lauren Mansfield.

References

1990 births
Living people
Basketball players from Milwaukee
Point guards
American women's basketball players
Canberra Capitals players
Cleveland State University alumni
Shooting guards
American expatriate basketball people in Australia
Rufus King International High School alumni
21st-century American women